Les Fusiliers de Sherbrooke is a Primary Reserve infantry regiment of the Canadian Army. It is based in Sherbrooke, Quebec, with a sub-unit in Granby.

Badge
A grenade with the Crown superimposed upon the ball within an annulet inscribed Les Fusiliers de Sherbrooke, surmounted by a beaver and super-imposed upon a maple leaf; the whole resting on a scroll inscribed Droit au but.

Lineage

Les Fusiliers de Sherbrooke 
Originated 1 April 1910 in Sherbrooke, Quebec as the 54th Regiment (Carabiniers de Sherbrooke)
Redesignated 29 March 1920 as Les Carabiniers de Sherbrooke
Redesignated 15 January 1933 as Les Fusiliers de Sherbrooke
Redesignated 7 November 1940 as Les Fusiliers de Sherbrooke (Reserve)
Redesignated 18 March 1942 as the 2nd (Reserve) Battalion, Les Fusiliers de Sherbrooke
Redesignated 1 June 1945 as Les Fusiliers de Sherbrooke

Common point of confusion
Early in World War II the Sherbrooke Fusiliers Regiment was formed with men from Les Fusiliers de Sherbrooke and The Sherbrooke Regiment.  Shortly after establishment, the spelling was changed to "Fusilier", as in Sherbrooke Fusilier Regiment.  This singular form of the name is on the cap badge and shoulder title.  Its Royal Canadian Armoured Corps lineage, battle honours and armoured traditions are perpetuated by The Sherbrooke Hussars through The Sherbrooke Regiment.  Les Fusiliers de Sherbrooke is an infantry regiment and shares the battle honours.

Further evidence of the singular form of the regimental name is found on the metal cap badge, which consists of a flaming grenade and a banner with the motto, "DROIT AU BUT" in French.  The motto and the bomb were borrowed from Les Fusiliers de Sherbrooke.  In the centre is a horse's head surrounded by the words "SHERBROOKE FUSILIER REGIMENT".  The horse was found on the family coat of arms of Sir John Cope Sherbrooke, namesake of the home city.

The official Canadian Forces names must not be translated haphazardly.  After GO 42/41 and GO 62/41, the name 'Fusiliers' changed from the plural to the singular 'Fusilier' form.  Therefore, only during 1940 was the regimental name plural. The foregoing as copied from official Department of National Defence references (A-DH-267-000/AF-003, page 2-2-67) accessed 21 Jun 14.

Lineage Chart

Perpetuations

The Great War
163rd Battalion (French-Canadian), CEF

Operational history

The Great War
Details of the 54th Regiment "Carabiniers de Sherbrooke" were called out on active service on 6 August 1914 for local protection duties.

The 163rd Battalion (French-Canadian), CEF was authorized on 22 December 1915 and embarked for Bermuda on 26 May 1916 for garrison duty. It sailed from Canada for Great Britain on 27 November 1916 where it was absorbed by the 10th Reserve Battalion, CEF, on 8 January 1917 to provide reinforcements for the Canadian Corps in the field. The battalion disbanded on 15 September 1917.

The Second World War
Les Fusiliers de Sherbrooke, in conjunction with The Sherbrooke Regiment (Machine Gun) (now The Sherbrooke Hussars), mobilized  The Sherbrooke Fusiliers Regiment, CASF for active service on 24 May 1940.  The name Fusilier was plural initially but subsequently changed to singular. It was redesignated as the 1st Battalion, The Sherbrooke Fusiliers Regiment, CASF on 7 November 1940 and as the 1st Battalion, The Sherbrooke Fusilier Regiment, CASF on 15 November 1940. The 1st Battalion was converted to an armoured regiment on 26 January 1942 and designated as  the 27th Armoured Regiment (The Sherbrooke Fusilier Regiment), CAC, CASF.  By this time the name Fusilier was singular. It was redesignated as the 27th Armoured Regiment (The Sherbrooke Fusilier Regiment), RCAC, CASF on 2 August 1945. The regiment served in Newfoundland on garrison duty from 13 August 1941 to 15 February 1942, and embarked for Great Britain on 27 October 1942. On D-Day, 6 June 1944, it landed in Normandy, France as part the 2nd Canadian Armoured Brigade, and it continued to fight in North West Europe until the end of the war. The overseas regiment was disbanded on 15 February 1946.

The regiment subsequently mobilized the 1st Battalion, Les Fusiliers de Sherbrooke, CASF' for active service on 18 March 1942. It served in Canada in a home defence role as part of the 15th Infantry Brigade, 7th Canadian Division and the 14th Infantry Brigade, 6th Canadian Division.  Between September 30, 1942, and October 13, 1943, Les Fusiliers de Sherbrooke, CASF was stationed at Camp Debert, Nova Scotia. On 10 January 1945, it embarked for Great Britain, where it was disbanded for reinforcements on 18 January 1945.

Afghanistan
The regiment contributed an aggregate of more than 20% of its authorized strength to the various Task Forces which served in Afghanistan between 2002 and 2014.

Regimental band
It has a history than spans long before the creation of the regiment in 1910. The band's first director, Lieutenant Serge Bélanger, led the band with a small group of musicians, laid the foundations for the band to be significantly expanded to a 30-member force. It is one of nine military bands in Quebec. In 1996, Captain Sylvain Côté took over as director of music, a position he still held . The regimental band supports the personnel of the regiment for various ceremonies and parades, as well as units in Estrie. The band also has engaged in many charity concerts in Quebec. In April 2013, the band donated $2,000 to musical organizations in the region.

Alliances 
 - The Rifles

Battle honours
In the list below, battle honours in small capitals were awarded for participation in large operations and campaigns, while those in lowercase indicate honours granted for more specific battles. Those battle honours in bold type are emblazoned on the regimental colour.

The Great War

The Second World War

Afghanistan Theatre Honour

Notable personalities

 Canada's leading tank ace Maj. (later Brig.-Gen.) S.V. Radley-Walters served as the Officer Commanding C Squadron of the 27th Armoured Regiment (The Sherbrooke Fusilier Regiment), RCAC, CASF. He would later serve as the first Commanding Officer of the Regular Army 8th Canadian Hussars (Princess Louise's), the Commandant of the Royal Canadian Armoured Corps School, Commander of 2 Combat Group at CFB Petawawa and Commander of the Combat Training Centre, Gagetown, NB.
 Lieutenant Colonel Jean-Marie-Joseph-Pantaléon Pelletier was the regiment's first commanding officer. He had previously served with the 9th Voltigeurs during the North-West Rebellion and had been the medical officer of the 11th Hussars of Richmond.

Armoury

Les Fusiliers de Sherbrooke Regimental Museum

The museum promotes the military history of Sherbrooke and the military history of Canada. The museum exhibits materials that relate to the regiment's history, from its inception to the present. The museum collects, preserves, and shows, documents, artifacts and photos which illustrate the military life of other regiments and units.

See also

 List of armouries in Canada
 Military history of Canada
 History of the Canadian Army
 Canadian Forces

External links
regiments.org
Musique des Fusiliers de Sherbrooke

Order of precedence

References

 

Fusiliers de Sherbrooke
Fusilier regiments of Canada
Fusiliers de Sherbrooke
Military units and formations established in 1910
1910 establishments in Quebec
Regimental museums in Canada
Organizations based in Sherbrooke
Military units and formations of Canada in World War II